Trans Tech Bus, a division of Transportation Collaborative Inc., is an American manufacturer of conventional and environmentally friendly electric Type A school buses.  Established in 2007 as a successor to the defunct U.S. Bus Corporation, the company produces Type A & Type A-II School Buses and various models of commercial buses, all built on cutaway vehicle chassis.

Trans Tech Bus headquarters and production are located in a  facility located in Warwick, New York, United States.

History
In November 2007, the shuttered school bus manufacturer U.S. Bus Corporation was reorganized and re-located to Warwick, New York.  Renamed Trans Tech Bus, the new company introduced three different models of school buses.  Single and Dual Rear Wheel models were based on Ford and GM van chassis, while the Medium-Duty model was built on a GM medium-duty truck chassis.  The Medium-Duty bus was discontinued after 2009 following the end of General Motors production of the C4500/5500 chassis.

For 2012, the Trans Tech model line saw a complete redesign.  The new ST Aero, SST, and Roadstar feature a redesigned bodyshell with a focus on aerodynamics.  The CST (Child-Safe Transporter) is a version of the SST available for MFSAB (Multi-Function School Activity Bus) use.
A new bus on Ford Transit chassis was introduced. and is set to begin production in April 2017 named "Trans Star" with up to 20 passengers.

Models

2012–present

2007-2011

TransTech Bus has a flexible manufacturing facility which allow a wide variety of options, TransTech Buses may include:

e-Trans
In October 2011, at the yearly conference of the National Association of Pupil Transportation, Trans Tech debuted the first factory-built battery-powered electric school bus.  A 42-passenger vehicle based on the Newton electric truck from Smith Electric Vehicles.  With the chassis manufactured in the Bronx, New York City, the entire bus was manufactured in New York State. A set of two Lithium-ion batteries give the eTrans an approximate range of up to 130 miles between charges, taking an average of eight hours to fully recharge. This initial vehicle was never certified to operate, and the grant project  was later taken over by Motiv Power Systems. The Motiv Powered SSTe has been shown at shows including the Green California Summit and is commercially available from TransTech.

References 

School bus manufacturers
Bus manufacturers of the United States
Warwick, New York
American companies established in 2007
Vehicle manufacturing companies established in 2007